Indian Lake is a reservoir in the city of Lawrence in Marion County, Indiana, United States. It was created in 1929 by damming Indian Creek, a tributary to Fall Creek.

Prior to the creation of Geist Reservoir in 1943 and Eagle Creek Reservoir in 1967, Indian Lake was the largest body of water in Marion County.

References

Reservoirs in Indiana
Protected areas of Marion County, Indiana
Geography of Indianapolis
Bodies of water of Marion County, Indiana